Leo Schrall (April 7, 1907 – February 3, 1999) was an infielder and manager in minor league baseball and a head coach in college baseball.

Born in Cresson, Pennsylvania, Schrall attended University of Notre Dame, where he enjoyed a successful career as three-sport student-athlete. He excelled at baseball, being considered by many critics as one of the premier shortstops in college baseball. Schrall was the regular shortstop for Notre Dame from 1927 to 1928, and started his professional baseball career after graduating in 1928.

Schrall played from 1929 through 1932 in the Three-I, Middle Atlantic and Mississippi Valley leagues, compiling a .252 batting average with six different teams in 324 games.

A highly successful head coach, he led the Bradley Braves squad from 1949 to 1972.

Besides Bradley, Schrall also managed the Peoria Redwings of the All-American Girls Professional Baseball League (AAGPBL). He took over the leadership of the Redwings late in 1947 and managed them in the 1948 and 1949 seasons. He later managed for the  Hastings Giants of the Class D Nebraska State League from 1957 to 1959.

Honors

In 1983 Schrall was named to the Greater Peoria Sports Hall of Fame. 

Schrall  is featured in the Baseball Hall of Fame and Museum display Women in Baseball, the AAGPBL permanent display in Cooperstown, New York, which was inaugurated in 1988 in honor of the entire league rather than individual baseball personalities.

Personal
Schrall was a longtime resident of Peoria, Illinois, where he died in 1999 at the age of 91.

References

External links

1907 births
1999 deaths
Altoona Engineers players
Beaver Falls Beavers players
Decatur Commodores players
Dubuque Tigers players
Jeannette Jays players
Peoria Tractors players
Minor league baseball managers
All-American Girls Professional Baseball League managers
Bradley Braves baseball coaches
University of Notre Dame alumni
Sportspeople from Peoria, Illinois
Baseball players from Pennsylvania